Barry Manilow is an American singer–songwriter, musician, arranger, producer, and conductor. His discography consists of 31 studio albums, 6 live albums, 17 compilation albums, and 57 singles (15 #1's). Signed to his first recording contract in 1969 by Tony Orlando, after writing, singing, and recording hit jingles for business corporations in the mid and late 1960s, Manilow released his first solo album, Barry Manilow, in 1973. He is best known for such recordings as "Mandy", "Can't Smile Without You", and "Copacabana (At the Copa)". To date, he has sold more than 85 million records worldwide, making him one of the best selling recording artists of all time.

Albums

Studio albums

Live albums

Compilation albums

Soundtracks

Singles

References

Discography
Discographies of American artists
Pop music discographies